List of seaweeds of the Cape Peninsula and False Bay may refer to:
List of green seaweeds of the Cape Peninsula and False Bay
List of brown seaweeds of the Cape Peninsula and False Bay
List of red seaweeds of the Cape Peninsula and False Bay